PMI may stand for:

Computer science
 Pointwise mutual information, in statistics
 Privilege Management Infrastructure in cryptography
 Product and manufacturing information in CAD systems

Companies
 Philip Morris International, tobacco company
 Picture Music International, former division of EMI
 Precious Moments, Inc., American giftware catalog company
 Precision Monolithics, a semiconductor manufacturer

Economics
 Passenger-mile
 Post-merger integration
 Private mortgage insurance or lenders mortgage insurance
 Purchasing Managers' Index, of business sentiment

Locations
 Palma de Mallorca Airport (IATA airport code PMI)

Mathematics
 Pointwise mutual information, measure in statistical probability theory
 Principle of Mathematical Induction, a method of proof involving the natural numbers

Organizations
 Plumbing Manufacturers International
 Project Management Institute
 Palang Merah Indonesia, the Indonesian Red Cross Society

Schools
Philippine Maritime Institute
PMI College - Bohol, Tagbilaran City
Pima Medical Institute, US

Medicine
 The pulse at the point of maximum impulse (PMI) is the apex beat of the heart
 Post-mortem interval, the time since a death

Technique
 Positive material identification of a metallic alloy
 Preventive maintenance inspection, USAF

Other uses
 US Presidential Management Internship, now Presidential Management Fellows Program

See also